Martin John Feveyear (born mid-1966) is a British record producer and audio engineer based in Seattle, Washington. Beginning as a singer-songwriter and musician, Feveyear soon began recording work for artists in both the UK and US before moving to Seattle at the age of 25. Together with Christian Fulghum (former bassist for Sister Psychic), he opened Jupiter Studios in Seattle in 1996. He has since worked with artists and groups — producing, engineering, arranging, mixing, mastering and additional instruments — such as Mark Lanegan, Mudhoney, Duff McKagan's Loaded, Kings of Leon, The Presidents of the United States of America, Queens of the Stone Age, Amber Pacific, Jesse Sykes, Sirens Sister, Green Apple Quick Step, Nevada Bachelors, The Minus 5, and Brandi Carlile, among others.

Through 2008 and 2009, Feveyear toured with Duff McKagan's Loaded, after producing the releases Wasted Heart and Sick, as the group's tour manager and sound engineer during live shows.

Credits

For a somewhat incomplete but slightly more updated list of credits go to *

References

External links 

 
 

1966 births
British record producers
English record producers
Living people
Recording studios in Washington (state)